Imías is a municipality and town in the Guantánamo Province of Cuba. It is located on the southern coast of Cuba, bordering the Caribbean Sea to the south.

Geography
The municipality of Imías borders with San Antonio del Sur, Baracoa and Maisí. The town is crossed by the Carretera Central, a west-east highway spanning the length of Cuba, and counts a little airport.

Demographics
In 2004, the municipality of Imías had a population of 20,959.

See also
Municipalities of Cuba
List of cities in Cuba

References

External links

Populated places in Guantánamo Province